North Battle Mountain is an unincorporated community in Lander County, Nevada, United States.

North Battle Mountain was a station on the Western Pacific Railroad.

North Battle Mountain is located North Battle Mountain Mining Area, which has barite, silver, lead, copper and gold resources.

References

Unincorporated communities in Lander County, Nevada
Unincorporated communities in Nevada